Maria Luiza David Bueno de Lima (known as Marilu Bueno; 27 February 1940 – 22 June 2022) was a Brazilian actress.

Selected filmography
Television
 1972 - O Bofe	- Margarida (Margot)
 1976 - Estúpido Cupido - Maria Antonieta Siqueira (Mariinha)
 1977 - Sem Lenço, sem Documento - Gilda Duran
 1982 - Chico Anysio Show - Pretória
 1983 - Guerra dos Sexos - Olívia
 1984 - Partido Alto - Sulamita Miranda
 1985 - A Gata Comeu - Tereza (Tetê)
 1986 - Dona Beija - Augusta 
 1988 - O Primo Basílio - Dona Felicidade de Noronha 
 1989 - República - Sofia
 1990 - Escolinha do Professor Raimundo -	Pretória
 1992 - De Corpo e Alma -	Lacy Bianchi
 1994 - Quatro por Quatro - Calpúrnia (Tia Pupu)
 1996 - O Fim do Mundo - Dagmar
 1996 - Caça Talentos - Fada Margarida
 2000 - Você Decide - Marilda
 2002 - O Quinto dos Infernos - Violante
 2003 - Kubanacan - Sodoma
 2003 - Sítio do Picapau Amarelo - Dona Carochinha
 2004 - Da Cor do Pecado -	Stela
 2006 - Bicho do Mato - Zulmira de Sá Freitas (Dinda Zuzu)
 2008 - Chamas da Vida - Catarina Amaro da Silva
 2012 - Guerra dos Sexos -	Olívia
 2014 - Alto Astral - Marieta Santana
 2016 - Êta Mundo Bom! - Narcisa
 2020 - Salve-se Quem Puder - Dulce Sampaio

Cinema
 1960 - O Cupim
 1989 - Better Days Ahead - Adelaide
 1990 - Lua de Cristal - Zuleika
 2003 - The Man of the Year

References

External links
 

1940 births
2022 deaths
Actresses from Rio de Janeiro (city)
Brazilian television actresses
Brazilian telenovela actresses
Brazilian film actresses
20th-century Brazilian actresses
21st-century Brazilian actresses